Rhizoglyphoides is a genus of mites in the family Acaridae.

Species
 Rhizoglyphoides nidicola V. I. Volgin, 1978

References

Acaridae